Carol Griffith Williams is a Democratic member of the Montana Senate.  She represented District 46 from 2004 to 2012. In 2011, she was the Leader of the Democratic Caucus. She is the first woman to hold the position of majority leader in Montana history. She was previously a member of the Montana House of Representatives from 1999 through 2000.

In 2000, she ran for lieutenant governor of Montana. She and the governor nominee, Mark O'Keefe, lost in the general election to Judy Martz.

Her husband, Pat Williams, is a former member of congress from Montana.

External links
Montana State Senate - Carol Williams official government website
Project Vote Smart - Senator Carol Williams (MT) profile
Follow the Money - Carol Williams
2006 2004 Senate campaign contributions
2002 House campaign contributions
2000 Lt. Governor contributions
Carol Williams for Montana official campaign website

Living people
Democratic Party members of the Montana House of Representatives
Democratic Party Montana state senators
Women state legislators in Montana
1949 births
21st-century American women